Adaldag (c. 90028 April 988; also Adelgis, Adelger, and Adalgag) was the seventh archbishop of Hamburg-Bremen, from 937 until his death.

He was of noble birth, a relation and pupil of Adalward, Bishop of Verden, and became canon of Hildesheim. Otto I made him his chancellor and notary immediately after his accession, and on the death of Archbishop Unni in 936 nominated him to the vacant see.

None of the early incumbents of the see ruled for so long, and none did so much for the diocese, though his success was partly the fruit of his predecessors’ labors and of peculiarly favorable circumstances. Under Adaldag the metropolitan see obtained its first suffragans, by the erection of the bishoprics of Ribe, Schleswig, and Århus; and that of the Slavic territories of Aldenburg (today's Oldenburg in Holstein) was also placed under Hamburg. Not to be confused with Oldenburg in Oldenburg, which had formerly belonged to the diocese of Verden.

He resisted successfully a renewal of the efforts of Cologne to claim jurisdiction over Bremen. He gained many privileges for his see, in jurisdiction, possession of land, and market rights, by his close relations with the emperors, especially Otto I. He accompanied the latter on his journey to Rome, and remained with him from 961 to 965, and is mentioned as the emperor's chief counselor at the time of his coronation in Rome. Otto placed the deposed pope Benedict V in his custody.

After Adaldag's return to Hamburg, he still maintained these relations, and his privileges were confirmed by Otto II and by the regency of Otto III. The later years of his life were troubled by inroads of the Danes and Slavonians on the north, and he may have witnessed the sack of Hamburg by the latter under Mistiwoi.

References

External links
 mittelalter-genealogie.de 

900s births
988 deaths
10th-century archbishops
Archbishops of Hamburg-Bremen
Bishops of Schleswig

Year of birth uncertain